Charles Delagrave (17 January 1881 – 25 August 1952) was a Canadian notary and politician.

Born in Quebec City, Quebec, Delagrave was educated at the Séminaire de Québec  and the Université Laval before becoming a notary in 1903.

He was elected to the Legislative Assembly of Quebec for Québec-Ouest in 1935. A Liberal, he was re-elected in 1936 and 1939. He was appointed to the Legislative Council of Quebec for de La Durantaye in 1944. He served until his death in 1952.

References

1881 births
1952 deaths
Politicians from Quebec City
Quebec Liberal Party MLCs
Quebec Liberal Party MNAs
Vice Presidents of the National Assembly of Quebec